Bodyguard is a 2011 Indian Kannada-language romance comedy action film starring Jaggesh and Daisy Shah. The film is directed by Isaiah. Parimala Jaggesh, wife of Jaggesh is producing this film jointly with him under Gururaja films banner. Vinayachandra has composed the music and Ashok V. Raman has handled the camera work. Also, edited by Enzo, Fill, and Jerry. The film is a remake of the 2010 Malayalam film Bodyguard.

The film released on 4 November 2011 with generally negative reviews.

Cast
 Jaggesh as Jayakrishna
 Daisy Shah as Ammu
 Spoorthi Suresh as Poorna
 Gurudutt as Ashok
 Sadhu Kokila as Neelambara
 Bank Janardhan
 Jeevan

Soundtrack
The music was composed by Vinay Chandra and released by Akshaya Audio.

Reception

Critical response 

B S Srivani from Deccan Herald wrote "There is hardly any depth in other roles as the film itself was meant to be a walk in the park. As such, this Bodyguard has little cinema muscle to show except the last 20 minutes of the film.The film perks up interest then and makes up for the rest". A critic from News18 India wrote "Ashok's camera work and Vinaya Chandra's music are much better when compared to other technical work in the film. 'Body Guard' is just an average flick which can be enjoyed only by ardent Jaggesh fans".

Home media 
The film was telecast on Star Suvarna.

References

2010s Kannada-language films
2011 films
Kannada remakes of Malayalam films
Films about bodyguards
Indian action comedy films
Indian romantic comedy films
2011 action comedy films
2011 romantic comedy films